Alvank; is a village in the Meghri Municipality of the Syunik Province in Armenia.

History 
There is a 17th-18th century Armenian monastery in the village.

Demographics 
The National Statistical Service of the Republic of Armenia (ARMSTAT) reported its population as 343 in 2010, down from 382 at the 2001 census.

Gallery

References 

Populated places in Syunik Province